The 2018 London Sevens was the penultimate event of the 2017–18 World Rugby Sevens Series and the eighteenth edition of the London Sevens. The tournament was held at Twickenham Stadium, London on 2–3 June 2018. Fiji won the tournament by defeating South Africa 21–17 in the final. However it was Ireland who stole the show, finishing in third place in their first World Series tournament since 2004. Ireland thus became the first invitational side to reach the semi-finals and the podium of a World Rugby Sevens Series event.

Format

Teams
The fifteen core teams played in the tournament, along with one invited team, Ireland.

Pool stages
All times in British Summer Time (UTC+01:00). The games as scheduled are as follows:

Pool A

Pool B

Pool C

Pool D

Knockout stage

13th Place

Challenge Trophy

5th Place

Cup

Tournament placings

Source: World Rugby

Players

Scoring leaders

Source: World Rugby

Dream Team
The following seven players were selected to the tournament Dream Team at the conclusion of the tournament:

References

External links
 Tournament page

London
London Sevens
London Sevens
London Sevens
London Sevens